Breathwork is a term for various breathing practices in which the conscious control of breathing is said to influence a person's mental, emotional or physical state, with a therapeutic effect. Breathwork may be helpful for relaxation and stress in a similar way to meditation. Although there are claims that breathwork may provide other health benefits, no other health benefits have been proven. During a breathwork session, individuals will typically lie down and be instructed to breathe using particular methods, depending on the sub-type of breathwork. In addition to a practitioner, breathwork sessions will often have "sitters" present. Sitters are individuals who provide emotional or physical support to those practicing breathwork. Most breathwork sessions last around an hour. Breathwork practitioners believe that an individual's particular pattern of passive breathing can lead to insights about their unconscious mind.

Some common side effects include "sleepiness; tingling in the hands, feet, or face; and a sense of altered consciousness that can be distressing to some." Breathwork is generally considered safe if done with a skilled practitioner, but there are contraindications such as cardiovascular disease, glaucoma, high blood pressure, mental illness, severe asthma, or seizure disorders, among others.

Description and sub-types
Breathwork is a method of breath control that attempts to give rise to altered states of consciousness, and to have an effect on physical and mental well-being. Derived from various spiritual and pre-scientific traditions from around the world, it was pioneered in the West by Wilhelm Reich. According to Jack Raso, breathwork is described by proponents as a multiform "healing modality" characterized by stylized breathing. Its purported design is to effect physical, emotional, and spiritual change. Such a process can allegedly "dissolve limiting programs" that are "stored" in the mind and body, and increases one's ability to handle more "energy". Vipassana Meditation focuses on breathing in and around the nose to calm the mind (anapanasati).

There are several sub-types of breathwork:

Rebirthing-Breathwork A process described as releasing suppressed traumatic childhood memories, especially those related to one's own birth. Orr proposed that correct breathing can cure disease and relieve pain. Orr devised rebirthing therapy in the 1970s after he supposedly re-lived his own birth while in the bath. He claimed that breathing techniques could be used to purge traumatic childhood memories that had been repressed. There is no evidence that individuals can remember their births. Memories of one's birth that appear to resurface during a rebirthing-breathwork practice are believed to be the result of false memories. Rebirthing-breathwork is one of the practices critiqued by anti-cult experts Margaret Singer and Janja Lalich in the book Crazy Therapies: What Are They? Do They Work?. Singer and Lalich write that proponents of such "bizarre" practices are proud of their non-scientific approach, and that this finds favor with an irrational clientele. In 2006, a panel that consisted of over one hundred experts participated in a survey of psychological treatments; they considered rebirthing therapy to be discredited.
Vivation A practice that claims to improve wellbeing through the use of circular breathing. 
Holotropic Breathwork A practice that uses rapid breathing and other elements such as music to put individuals in altered states of consciousness. It was developed by Stanislav Grof as a successor to his LSD-based psychedelic therapy, following the suppression of legal LSD use in the late 1960s. Side effects of the hyperventilation aspect of holotropic breathwork can include cramping in the hands and around the mouth. As the expressed goal of holotropic breathwork is to attain an altered state, it should not be attempted alone. Following a 1993 report commissioned by the Scottish Charities Office, concerns about the risk that the hyperventilation technique could cause seizure or lead to psychosis in vulnerable people caused the Findhorn Foundation to suspend its breathwork programme.
Others There are many other types of Breathwork which have emerged over the last few decades, including Integrative Breathwork, Transformational Breathwork, Shamanic Breathwork, Conscious Connected Breathing, Radiance Breathwork, Zen Yoga Breathwork.

See also
 Buteyko method
 Gay Hendricks
 Hyperventilation
 Hypoventilation 
 Pranayama, the use of the breath in yoga
 Primal therapy
 Wim Hof

References 

Alternative medicine
Energy therapies
Manual therapy
Meditation
New Age practices
Pseudoscience
Psychotherapies